The 2010 Malaysia Open Grand Prix Gold was the fourth grand prix's badminton tournament of the 2010 BWF Grand Prix Gold and Grand Prix. The tournament was held at the Johor Bahru City Stadium in Johor, Malaysia from 6 to 11 July 2010 and had a total purse of $120,000.

Men's singles

Seeds

  Lee Chong Wei (champion)
  Taufik Hidayat (semifinals)
  Boonsak Ponsana (withdrew)
  Wong Choong Hann (finals)
  Hu Yun (quarterfinals)
  Muhammad Hafiz Hashim (quarterfinals)
  Chan Yan Kit (quarterfinals)
  Andre Kurniawan Tedjono (quarterfinals)
  Hans-Kristian Vittinghus (third round)
  Anand Pawar (first round)
  Wong Wing Ki (third round)
  Chong Wei Feng (third round)
  Tan Chun Seang (third round)
  Ajay Jayaram (semifinals)
  Beryno Wong (second round)
  Chan Kwong Beng (first round)

Finals

Top half

Section 1

Section 2

Section 3

Section 4

Bottom half

Section 5

Section 6

Section 7

Section 8

Women's singles

Seeds

  Pi Hongyan (semifinals)
  Zhou Mi (finals) 
  Yip Pui Yin (champion)
  Wong Mew Choo (semifinals)
  Salakjit Ponsana (quarterfinals)
  Maria Febe Kusumastuti (first round)
  Fransisca Ratnasari (first round)
  Chan Tsz Ka (quarterfinals)

Finals

Top half

Section 1

Section 2

Bottom half

Section 3

Section 4

Men's doubles

Seeds

  Koo Kien Keat / Tan Boon Heong (quarterfinals)
  Markis Kido / Hendra Setiawan (champion)
  Hendra Aprida Gunawan / Alvent Yulianto (finals)
  Mohd Zakry Abdul Latif / Mohd Fairuzizuan Mohd Tazari (withdrew)
  Choong Tan Fook / Lee Wan Wah (second round)
  Gan Teik Chai / Tan Bin Shen (quarterfinals)
  Chan Peng Soon / Lim Khim Wah (second round)
  Yohan Hadikusumo Wiratama / Wong Wai Hong (semifinals)

Finals

Top half

Section 1

Section 2

Bottom half

Section 3

Section 4

Women's doubles

Seeds

  Chin Eei Hui / Wong Pei Tty (first round)
  Savitree Amitrapai / Vacharaporn Munkit (quarterfinals)
  Misaki Matsutomo / Ayaka Takahashi (second round)
  Duanganong Aroonkesorn / Kunchala Voravichitchaikul (champion)
  Zhang Dan / Zhang Zhibo (semifinals)
  Vivian Hoo Kah Mun / Woon Khe Wei (second round)
  Rie Eto / Yu Wakita (quarterfinals)
  Lotte Jonathans / Paulien van Dooremalen (quarterfinals)

Finals

Top half

Section 1

Section 2

Bottom half

Section 3

Section 4

Mixed doubles

Seeds

  Hendra Aprida Gunawan / Vita Marissa (quarterfinals)
  Songphon Anugritayawon / Kunchala Voravichitchaikul (withdrew)
  Sudket Prapakamol / Saralee Thungthongkam (finals)
  Chan Peng Soon / Goh Liu Ying (quarterfinals)
  Flandy Limpele /  Lotte Jonathans (second round)
  Yohan Hadikusumo Wiratama / Tse Ying Suet (first round)
  Shintaro Ikeda / Reiko Shiota (quarterfinals)
  Tan Wee Kiong / Woon Khe Wei (quarterfinals)

Finals

Top half

Section 1

Section 2

Bottom half

Section 3

Section 4

References

External links 
 Tournament Link

Malaysia Masters
Malaysia
Malaysia Open Grand Prix Gold
Sport in Johor
Johor Bahru